Friday is a day of the week.

Friday or Fridays may also refer to:

People with the name
 Friday (surname) (includes a list of people with the name)
 Friday (Arapaho chief) (ca. 1822–1881) interpreter and negotiator during the Treaties of Fort Laramie in 1851 and 1868

Arts, entertainment, and media

Fictional entities
 Friday (2000 AD), a character in the 2000 AD comics
 F.R.I.D.A.Y., a fictional artificial intelligence appearing in American comic books published by Marvel Comics.
 Friday (G.I. Joe), a fictional member of the Phoenix Guard in G.I. Joe: America's Elite
 Friday (Robinson Crusoe), a main character in Robinson Crusoe
 Friday, a canine character in the 2009 film Hotel for Dogs
 Friday Caliban, a character in A Series of Unfortunate Events
 Joe Friday, a fictional police detective in the television series Dragnet

Films 
 Friday (1995 film), a 1995 film featuring rapper Ice Cube and comedian Chris Tucker
 Friday (2012 film), an Indian drama film
 Friday (2016 film), a Russian comedy film
 Friday (film series), a series of comedy films starring Ice Cube and John Witherspoon
 His Girl Friday, a 1940 American screwball comedy film
 Man Friday (film), and 1975 British/American film

Literature
 Friday (novel), a novel by Robert A. Heinlein
 Friday, or, The Other Island, a novel by Michel Tournier
 Al-Jumua, 'Friday', the 62nd chapter (sura) of the Quran

Music

Full-length works
 Friday (album), by Christine Milton
 Friday (opera) or 
 Friday (soundtrack), by Ice Cube

Songs
 "Friday" (Daniel Bedingfield song)
 "Friday" (Rebecca Black song)
 "Friday", by Bowling For Soup from Rock on Honorable Ones!!
 "Friday", by J.J. Cale from the album 5
 "Friday", by Goldspot
 "Friday", by Ice Cube from soundtrack of Friday
 "Friday", by IU from their album Modern Times
 "Friday", by Joe Jackson from his album I'm the Man
 "Friday", by Phish from Round Room
 "Friday", by Plies from The Real Testament
 "Friday" (Riton and Nightcrawlers song) featuring Mufasa and Hypeman
 "Friday", by Sunny Day Real Estate from Sunny Day Real Estate (album)
 "Friday", by Suzi Quatro from Quatro (album)
 "Friday", by Stefania

Periodicals
 Friday (magazine), a Japanese weekly photographic magazine

Television
 Friday: The Animated Series, a TV cartoon based on the film series
 Fridays (TV series), an American comedy show which aired from 1980 to 1982
 Fridays (Cartoon Network), a 2003–07 Cartoon Network programming block

Idioms
 Gal Friday, an idiom from Robinson Crusoe, the feminine equivalent of Man Friday
 Man Friday, an especially faithful servant or one's best servant or right-hand man (inspired by the eponymous Robinson Crusoe character)

Other uses 
 Friday the 13th, a day considered unlucky in some traditions
 , an urban legend about an ill-fated ship
 T.G.I. Friday's, American restaurant chain

See also
 
  Friday the 13th (disambiguation)
 Girl Friday (disambiguation)
"Just Got Paid" (Johnny Kemp song), sometimes known as "Just Got Paid, Friday Night"